WKBL may refer to:

 Women's Korean Basketball League
 WKBL (AM), a radio station (1250 AM) licensed to Covington, Tennessee, United States